Fatherland (released as Singing the Blues in Red in the US) is a 1986 film about a German singer-songwriter, directed by Ken Loach and starring , , Cristine Rose and Sigfrit Steiner.

Production
The budget was £884,000.

The film is one of Loach's least-popular films, being referred to as "a heavy-handed and absurd political drama" in MIT's newspaper The Tech and Loach said in a 2016 Guardian interview that he "made a mess" of the film.  As the film was partly in German, its audience was limited in English-speaking countries.  Between its cinematic release and the 2013 DVD release, the film was rare.

The film was partly financed by the German television broadcaster ZDF. When the film was broadcast, they cut the scene in which Gerulf Pannach attacks a Christian Democrat politician for his fascist past. Loach said in an interview, "It was ironic that they should cut the only decent scene in the film."

References

External links

1986 drama films
1986 films
Films directed by Ken Loach
British drama films
Films set in Berlin
Films set in East Germany
Films set in West Germany
1980s English-language films
1980s British films